Fernanda Paz Astete Rojas (born 12 January 1997) is a Chilean tennis player.

Astete has a career-high singles ranking by the Women's Tennis Association (WTA) of 843, achieved on 21 March 2022. She also has a career-high doubles ranking by the WTA of 749, achieved on 4 April 2022. 

Astete competes for Chile in the Billie Jean King Cup, where she has a W/L record of 1–0.

Astete attended college at Rice University.

ITF Circuit finals

Doubles: 6 (1 title, 5 runners-ups)

References

External links
 
 
 
 Fernanda Astete at the Rice University

1997 births
Living people
Chilean female tennis players
Tennis players from Santiago
Rice Owls women's tennis players
21st-century Chilean women